Smt S.G. Indira a politician from All India Anna Dravida Munnetra Kazhagam party is a Member of the Parliament of India representing Tamil Nadu in the Rajya Sabha, the upper house of the Indian Parliament.

External links
 Profile on Rajya Sabha website

References

Rajya Sabha members from Tamil Nadu
All India Anna Dravida Munnetra Kazhagam politicians
Living people
Year of birth missing (living people)
Place of birth missing (living people)